Cathrine Roll-Matthiesen, née Svendsen (born 23 September 1967, in Porsgrunn) is a Norwegian former handball player.

She played in the clubs IF Borg, IL Vestar, Lunner IL, Bouillargues (France), Larvik HK, Tertnes Håndball and Tjølling IF. Between 1985 and 1996 she played in 233 matches for the Norwegian National team, scoring 918 goals.

References

1967 births
Living people
Norwegian female handball players
Olympic handball players of Norway
Olympic silver medalists for Norway
Handball players at the 1988 Summer Olympics
Handball players at the 1992 Summer Olympics
Sportspeople from Porsgrunn
Olympic medalists in handball
Medalists at the 1992 Summer Olympics
Medalists at the 1988 Summer Olympics